This is a bibliography of World War II warships. This list aims to include historical sources and literature (but not fictional works) related to individual warships of World War II. This article forms a part of the larger bibliography of World War II.

The article covers works about warship classes and groups of ships as well as books about individual warships. Works are sorted primarily into their respective types of warships (aircraft carriers, battleships, etc.) and then secondarily into national categories (Germany, United Kingdom, etc.).

Bibliography

Aircraft carriers

Germany

Italy

Japan

United Kingdom 

  — HMS Formidable
  — HMS Ark Royal

United States 

  — USS Savo Island
  — USS Belleau Wood
  — USS Enterprise
  — USS Wasp
  — USS Makin Island
  — USS Hornet
  — USS Lexington
  — USS Enterprise
  — USS Lexington

Battlecruisers

United Kingdom 

  — HMS Repulse (Sinking of Prince of Wales and Repulse)
  — HMS Repulse
  — HMS Hood
  — HMS Repulse

Battleships

France

Germany 

Bismarck
 
 
 
 
 
 
 
 
 
 
Gneisenau
 
 
Scharnhorst
 
 
 
 
 
 
 
Tirpitz

Italy

Japan

United Kingdom 

  — HMS Prince of Wales (Sinking of Prince of Wales and Repulse)
  — HMS Prince of Wales
  — HMS Prince of Wales
  — HMS Prince of Wales
 
 
  — HMS Royal Oak
  — HMS Royal Oak
  — HMS Rodney

United States 

  — USS Washington
  — Iowa class
  — Nevada class, Pennsylvania class, New Mexico class
  — Tennessee class, Colorado class
  — Essex class (USS Essex, USS Yorktown, etc.)

Destroyers

Germany

Japan

Soviet Union

United Kingdom 

  — HMS Electra
 
 
  — HMS Intrepid
  — HMS Kelly
  — HMS Kelly
  — HMS Faulknor
  — HMS Laforey; L-class destroyers (Lance, Gurkha, Lively, Legion, Lightning, Lookout, Loyal)

United States 

  — USS O'Bannon

Heavy cruisers and pocket battleships

Germany 

  — Admiral Scheer

Italy

Japan

United Kingdom

United States 

  — USS Minneapolis
  — USS Indianapolis
 
 
  — USS Louisville
  — USS Pensacola

Light cruisers

Australia 

  — HMAS Sydney
  — HMAS Perth
  — HMAS Sydney
  — HMAS Sydney

Germany

Italy

Japan

New Zealand 

  — HMNZS Leander
  — HMNZS Leander

United Kingdom 

  — HMS Penelope
 
  — HMS Trinidad
  — HMS Edinburgh
  — HMS Coventry

United States 

  — USS Helena

Motor gunboats

United Kingdom

Sloops

Australia 

  — HMAS Yarra

Submarines

France

Germany

Japan

United Kingdom 

 
 
  — HMS Thule
 
 
 
  — HMS Tally-Ho
  — HMS Thetis/Thunderbolt

United States 

 
  — USS Seawolf
  — USS Bullhead

Torpedo boats

Germany

Japan

United Kingdom

United States

See also 

 Bibliography of World War II
 Bibliography of World War II battles and campaigns in East Asia, South East Asia and the Pacific
 Bibliography of World War II battles and campaigns in Europe, North Africa and the Middle East
 List of ship classes of World War II
 List of ships of World War II

Further reading 

 
 
 
 
 
 
 
 
 
 
 

Warships